Hyloxalus cevallosi, also known as Palanda rocket frog, is a species of poison dart frogs in the family Dendrobatidae. It is named after Gabriel Cevallos García, a famous Ecuadorean writer. This species of frog exists on the east side of the Andes in Ecuador near the Pastaza Province as well as the Zamora-Chinchipe Province. Though it has been recorded in Peru, the records have yet to be confirmed. Its natural habitats are very humid premontane and pluvial premontane forests.

Description
Hyloxalus cevallosi is a small ground-dwelling species of frog that is easily overlooked. It is characterized by slanting lateral, ventrolateral, and relatively incomplete dorsolateral stripes, a large tympanum, almost non-fringed toes with no webbing, and a broad abdomen. One male measured  and two females  in snout–vent length.

Distribution
These include several sites in Pastaza Province in central Ecuador and another in Zamora-Chinchipe Province in the south-eastern part of the country. It has also been recorded from Peru but that report requires confirmation.

Status
Hyloxalus cevallosi is currently listed as "Endangered" by the IUCN on the IUCN Red List of Threatened Species and its population is decreasing. Members of the species live in less than five different areas worldwide in a total space less than 5000 square kilometers. It is threatened by habitat loss as the forests of the Amazonian foothills of the Andes are slowly disappearing due to agricultural development and logging. It is not known to live in any protected areas.

References

cevallosi
Amphibians of Ecuador
Endemic fauna of Ecuador
Taxa named by Juan A. Rivero
Amphibians described in 1991
Taxonomy articles created by Polbot